Jaime Javier Barrero López (18 September 1949 – 3 May 2022) was a Spanish politician. A member of the Spanish Socialist Workers' Party, he served in the Congress of Deputies from 1982 to 2016. He died of cancer in Huelva on 3 May 2022, at the age of 72.

References

1949 births
2022 deaths 
Deaths from cancer in Spain
20th-century Spanish politicians
21st-century Spanish politicians
Spanish Socialist Workers' Party politicians
People from the Province of Ávila
Members of the 2nd Congress of Deputies (Spain)
Members of the 3rd Congress of Deputies (Spain)
Members of the 4th Congress of Deputies (Spain)
Members of the 5th Congress of Deputies (Spain)
Members of the 6th Congress of Deputies (Spain)
Members of the 7th Congress of Deputies (Spain)
Members of the 8th Congress of Deputies (Spain)
Members of the 9th Congress of Deputies (Spain)
Members of the 10th Congress of Deputies (Spain)